Judah Sandhy is an Indian film music director who predominantly works in Kannada cinema. He rose to fame with 2017 Blockbuster film Operation Alamelamma.

Early life
Sandhy was born on 21 January 1989 in Bangalore, Karnataka, India. He went to St. Aloysius College, Bangalore.

Career
Judah Sandhy was the founder member and frontman of Bangalore's based band Slain formed at the time of his college. After graduating from college he started music production and decided to take music as his profession, setting up his own music studio and working for commercials, short film "son of a gun", raju bhai  and jingles. He made his debut as a music director in 2015 Kannada film Thamisra. In 2016 he composed music for Lifu Super and Badmaash starring Dhananjay and Sanchita Shetty. In 2017 he composed music for the blockbuster film Operation Alamelamma starring Rishi and Shraddha Srinath and then composed 3 of the 6 songs from Uppu Huli Khara. In the same year Judah Sandhy composed music for Chamak starring Ganesh and Rashmika Mandanna.

Filmography

References

External links
 

Living people
Kannada film score composers
Telugu film score composers
Year of birth missing (living people)